Rudolf Werthen is a Belgian violinist, conductor and teacher. He is founder and artistic director of the orchestra I Fiamminghi and was chief conductor of the symphonic orchestra of the Flemish Opera in 1989. He has taught at the Royal Conservatory of Ghent since 1975.

Werthen was born in Mechelen, Belgium and was tutored by André Gertler and Henryk Szeryng.

Awards and recognition

Queen Elisabeth Music Competition
 1971 Laureate 7th Prize Violin
 1985 Jury Violin

External links
rudolfwerthen.be official website

Belgian musicians
Belgian classical violinists
Male classical violinists
Belgian conductors (music)
Male conductors (music)
Living people
Year of birth missing (living people)
21st-century Belgian musicians
20th-century Belgian musicians
20th-century conductors (music)
21st-century conductors (music)
21st-century classical violinists
20th-century Belgian male musicians
21st-century male musicians